Norman Hughes (born 30 September 1952) is an English former field hockey player.

He won Bronze with the Great Britain squad at the 1984 Summer Olympics in Los Angeles. He also won silver with the England squad at the 1986 Hockey World Cup in London.

Hughes was born in Nantwich, Cheshire, and attended Crewe County Grammar School for Boys, as did fellow hockey international Joe Middleton. He was also a cricketer. He coaches at Wakefield Hockey Club.

References

External links
 
 

1952 births
Living people
English male field hockey players
Olympic field hockey players of Great Britain
British male field hockey players
Field hockey players at the 1984 Summer Olympics
People from Nantwich
Olympic medalists in field hockey
Sportspeople from Cheshire
Medalists at the 1984 Summer Olympics
Olympic bronze medallists for Great Britain
People educated at Ruskin High School, Crewe